Hooksburg is an unincorporated community in Morgan County, in the U.S. state of Ohio.

History
A post office called Hooksburg was established in 1872, and remained in operation until 1914. The community was named for Captain Isaac N. Hook, the original owner of the town site.

References

Unincorporated communities in Morgan County, Ohio
Unincorporated communities in Ohio
1872 establishments in Ohio